Cusseta Mountain is a hill in northeast Texas with summit  above sea level. It is the highest point in Cass County, Texas, and is the site of several communication towers. In the late 19th century, the community of Cusseta was at the base of the hill.

References

Mountains of Texas
Landforms of Cass County, Texas